The Phoenix Islands, or Rawaki, are a group of eight atolls and two submerged coral reefs that lie east of the Gilbert Islands and west of the Line Islands in the central Pacific Ocean, north of Samoa. They are part of the Republic of Kiribati. The only island of any commercial importance is Canton Island (also called Abariringa). The other islands are Enderbury, Rawaki (formerly Phoenix), Manra (formerly Sydney), Birnie, McKean, Nikumaroro (formerly Gardner), and Orona (formerly Hull).

The Phoenix Islands Protected Area, established in 2008, is one of the world's largest protected areas, and is home to about 120 species of coral and more than 500 species of fish. All of the Phoenix Islands are uninhabited, except for a few families who live on Kanton Island.

At various times in history, the Phoenix Islands have been considered to be part of the Gilberts Island group (which itself was sometimes known as the Kingsmill island group).

Geographically, Baker Island and Howland Island, two unincorporated territories of the United States that lie to the north of the Phoenix Islands, could be  considered part of the same island group as the Phoenix Islands. However, politically, and for statistical compilation purposes, Howland and Baker are considered part of the group known as the United States Minor Outlying Islands.

At one time, the United States laid claim to all the Phoenix Islands under the 1856 Guano Islands Act. However, when Kiribati became an independent republic in 1979, the United States and Kiribati signed the Treaty of Tarawa, under which the United States released all claims to the Phoenix Islands (except for Baker and Howland), which thenceforth became recognized as part of Kiribati.

The Phoenix Islands began to be known by that name sometime around the 1840s, as a generalization from one of the islands in the group, which had been named Phoenix Island earlier in the century (probably because Phoenix was a common name for the whaling ships that frequented the nearby waters at the time).

During the late 1930s, the Phoenix Islands were the site of the last colonial expansion attempted by the British Empire (through the Phoenix Islands Settlement Scheme).

Geography, flora and fauna

Canton Island

Canton Island (also called Abariringa), is the northernmost island in the Phoenix group, and the only inhabited one. Canton is mostly bare coral, covered with herbs, bunch grasses, low shrubs and a few trees. Its lagoon teems with 153 known species of marine life, including sharks, tuna, stingrays and eels. Land fauna includes at least 23 bird species, as well as lizards, rats, hermit crabs and turtles.

In the mid-20th century, Canton had an important trans-Pacific airport and refueling station, called Langton, but its importance declined in the late 1950s with the introduction of long-range jet aircraft. After a brief stint as a U.S. missile-tracking station, the airport fell into disuse. However, today, the airport is still there, and  it was still home to a small military presence: 20 persons were residing there, mostly living in the buildings erected during the occupation of the island by Great Britain and the United States between 1936 and 1976.

Enderbury Island
Its lagoon is rather tiny, comprising only a small percentage of the island's area. Herbs, bunchgrass, morning-glory vines and a few clumps of trees form the main vegetation on the island, while birds, rats and a species of beetle are the known fauna. Heavily mined for guano in the late 19th century, Enderbury has seen little human impact following the evacuation of the last four residents in 1942, during World War II.

Birnie Island
It contains a tiny lagoon, which has all but dried up. A nesting place for flocks of seabirds, Birnie is devoid of trees and is instead covered with low shrubs and grass. Unlike most of the other Phoenix Islands, Birnie does not appear to have been worked for guano or otherwise exploited by humans. It was declared a wildlife sanctuary in 1975.

McKean Island
McKean Island is the northwesternmost island of the Phoenix group. Carpeted with low herbs and grasses, McKean provides a sanctuary for the world's largest nesting population of lesser frigatebird (Fregata ariel), with a population of up to 85,000 birds. Actively worked for guano in the mid-19th century, it was abandoned by 1870, and no further use has been made of it.

Rawaki Island
Its lagoon is shallow and salty, with no connection to the ocean. It does, however, have several freshwater pools—the only known freshwater wetlands in the Phoenix Islands. Treeless, Rawaki is covered with herbs and grasses, and provides another important landing site for migratory seabirds. Worked for guano from 1859 to 1871, Rawaki was abandoned and no human use seems to have been made of it thereafter.

Manra Island
The island is covered with coconut palms, scrub forest, herbs and grasses, including the species Tournefortia, Pisonia, Morinda, Cordia, Guettarda, and Scaevola. Manra contains definite evidence of prehistoric inhabitation, in the form of at least a dozen platforms and remains of enclosures in the northeast and northwest portions of the island. K.P. Emory, an ethnologist at Honolulu's Bishop Museum, has estimated that two groups of people were present on Manra, one having migrated there from eastern Polynesia, the other from Micronesia. Wells and pits apparently dug by these early inhabitants were also found.

Extensively worked for guano beginning in 1884 by John T. Arundel & Co, Manra was developed into a copra plantation in the early 20th century. In 1938, Manra was selected as one of three atolls to be included in the Phoenix Islands Settlement Scheme, which represented the final expansion of the British Empire. Manra was subsequently plagued by drought and the death of the project's organizer. Due to these events, the effects of World War II and the declining copra market, the island was abandoned in 1963.

Orona Island
Like Manra, it is covered with coconut palms, scrub forest, and grasses; it also contains evidence of prehistoric Polynesian habitation. An ancient stone marae stands on the eastern tip of the island, together with ruins of shelters, graves and other platforms. Unlike Manra, Orona does not seem to have been worked for guano, but it became a coconut plantation and was made a part of the British Phoenix Islands Settlement Scheme. Residents were evacuated in 1963, due to drought and the declining copra market.

Nikumaroro
Vegetation is profuse, including scrub forest, coconut palms and herbs. Large quantities of birds nest on the island, which was once the headquarters for the British colonial officer heading up the Phoenix Islands Settlement Scheme, Gerald Gallagher. Gallagher constructed a village on the western end of the atoll, with wide, coral-paved streets, a parade ground, a cooperative store, an administrative center and residence, and a radio shack.

Gallagher died on Nikumaroro in 1941, and was buried on the island (where his empty grave monument can still be seen, though his remains were later moved to Tarawa). Like the other atolls in the settlement project, Nikumaroro was abandoned in 1963 due to the scarcity of fresh water, together with the declining market for the copra that had been produced on the island.

In recent years, Nikumaroro has appeared in media stories due to a theory that Amelia Earhart might have landed her plane at low tide on the edge of the atoll's barrier reef during her fateful around-the-world attempt in 1937. The International Group for Historic Aircraft Recovery (TIGHAR) made several expeditions to Nikumaroro during the 1990s and first decade of the 21st century, finding possible evidence, but no conclusive proof, for this theory. Investigation and expeditions to the island continue.

History of the islands

Early history
There is evidence to suggest that Howland Island was the site of a prehistoric settlement, which may have extended down to Rawaki, Canton, Manra and Orona —- probably in the form of a single community making use of several adjacent islands. Archaeological sites have been discovered on Manra and Orona that suggest there were two distinct groups of settlers, one from eastern Polynesia, and one from Micronesia. The hard life on these isolated islands undoubtedly led either to the extinction or emigration of these settled peoples, in much the same way that other islands in the area (such as Christmas Island and Pitcairn) were abandoned.

These ancient settlements were probably founded around 1000 BC, when eastern Melanesians are known to have travelled northwards across the water. Later settlement by Polynesians, and contact with Polynesia, is evident from archaeological digs. These have yielded basalt artifacts that originated in Samoa, the Marquesas, and the Cook Islands, and were transported to the Phoenix and Line Islands during the 12th–14th centuries AD.

Secondary discovery and mapping of the islands
In 1568, when Spanish navigator Álvaro de Mendaña de Neira was commanded to explore the South Pacific, he sailed between the Line Islands and the Phoenix Islands without sighting land, ultimately discovering "Isla de Jesus" (probably one of the islands in the Ellice group).

The oceans of the mid-Pacific and Micronesia opened up to new exploration in the early 19th century as whalers from Europe and the Americas began arriving. An influx of whaling vessels in the 1820s led to the secondary discovery and mapping of the islands between 1821–1825. They were the last islands in the Pacific to be fully explored and charted, probably because they were predominantly small, low, and isolated.

While it is clear that early 19th-century whalers were responsible for discovering most of Kiribati in the modern era, it is impossible to confirm exactly who discovered each of the islands, due to conflicting reports and inaccurate mapping. Jeremiah N. Reynolds's 1828 report to the American Navy recommended an exploring expedition to the Pacific because "the English charts, and those of other countries are as yet very imperfect. Much of their information has been obtained from loose accounts from whalers who were careless in some instances, and forgetful in others, and which were seized with greediness by the makers of maps and charts, in order to be the first to make these discoveries known."

The expedition surveyed the islands under the direction of William Hudson.

Identifying the secondary discoverers

Contemporary reports and later analysis provide conflicting evidence regarding the identification of the initial discoverers, a state of affairs only complicated by the numerous names given to each of the atolls.

In 1828, the U.S. Navy commissioned J.N. Reynolds to compile a survey of American discoveries in the South Pacific. Reynolds interviewed several New England whalers and inspected their logbooks, charts and documents. His report included at least 13 islands that fit roughly within the Phoenix group, but the coordinates he gave do not always compare to the now-established coordinates of that area.

Other contemporary reports of the islands added to the confusion about the details of the initial discoveries. The Frenchman Louis Tromelin reported his 1823 discovery of Phoenix island at 3°42'S, 170°43'W, while cartographer John Arrowsmith plotted it 12 minutes further north; a rediscovery of Sydney is at 4°26'30", 171°18'. The same year, James Coffin recorded "Enderby's Island" at 3°10', 171°10. This clearly illustrates "the impossibility of deciding who discovered which of these...islands, and when...."

The United States Exploring Expedition seems to have been the first to use the name "Phoenix" to refer to the whole island group. It had previously been used only to refer to one of the islands within the group.

McKean Island
McKean Island was the first of the Phoenix group to be reported and named. It was discovered on May 28, 1794, by a British captain, Henry Barber, of the ship Arthur. Barber named it Drummond's Island, plotting it at 3°40'S, 176°51'W. It was later named  Arthur Island and appeared as such in charts of the time and was recorded as located at 3°30'S, 176°0'W. On August 19, 1840, Commander Charles Wilkes of the United States Exploring Expedition mapped it and renamed it McKean Island, after a member of his crew.

Enderbury Island
Captain James Coffin of the British whaler Transit is credited with having discovered Enderbury Island in 1823, and to have named it "Enderby's Island" after the London whaling house of that name. However, when Coffin described his discoveries to Arrowsmith and other geographers, he did not mention Enderbury.

Birnie Island and Manra (Sydney Island)
Birnie and Sydney Islands are reported to have been discovered in 1823 by a “Captain Emmett”. This may have been the Captain Emmett (or "Emmert" or "Emment") of the British whaler  (or the Sydney), who may have named the islands after the ship and its owner, the London firm Alexander Birnie & Co. Alternatively, it may have been Captain William Emmett, from Sydney, who sailed regularly in the area and is known to have bought the brig Queen Charlotte from the whaler James Birnie (of the Birnie ship owning family) in 1820. Frenchman Louis Tromelin came upon Sidney's Island, either in 1823 or 1828, and placed it at 4°26'30", 171°18'; he went on to survey Phoenix Island.

Canton Island or Kanton or Abariringa
Two islands that were reported and charted in 1825 with coordinates similar to those of Canton Island were referred to in those documents as "Mary Island" and "Mary Balcoutts Island". In addition, Reynold's report describes a "Barney's Island" roughly at Canton's position, which may have been named and discovered by Capt. Joseph Barney of Equator, who was whaling in the area in 1823-4.

Nikumaroro (Gardner Island)
On January 8, 1824, Capt. Kemin, of an unnamed ship, discovered what may have been Gardner Island (at 4°45'S, 186°20'15"E) and McKean Island, naming them the "Kemin Islands". In 1825, Captain Joshua Gardner, reportedly aboard the whaler , discovered an island located at 4°20' S, 174°22' W, and named it "Gardner's Island". His discovery was reported in the Nantucket Enquirer in December 1827. However, Joshua Coffin (also reportedly aboard the Ganges) is sometimes credited with the discovery, and is said to have named the island after his ship's owner, Gideon Gardner.

During the United States Exploring Expedition of 1838–1842, Charles Wilkes identified Gardner's Island based on the previously reported position, and confirmed its existence.

Rawaki (Phoenix Island) 
The Frenchman Louis Tromelin, aboard the corvette Bayonnaise, came across Phoenix Island, (as well as Sydney Island, discussed above), probably in 1828 (but some sources give 1823 as the date). and 1826. Tromelin placed the island at 3°42'S, 189°17'E, and noted his belief that it had already been reported on Norie's map. Reynold’s report also mentions an island referred to as "Phenix", as well as other unnamed islands, at similar coordinates.

Orona (Hull Island)
Little is known about the discovery of Hull Island, but its existence was confirmed by the United States Exploring Expedition in 1841, which found it to be inhabited), and it was named by Charles Wilkes, after Commodore Isaac Hull.

Winslow Reef
The reef was discovered in 1851 by the whaler . Perry Winslow was the master of the ship on that occasion. Some have speculated this could have been the ship after which the Phoenix Island group is named, but several other whaling ships of the time were also named Phoenix, and one of the individual islands in the group had already been reported at an earlier date to bear the name “Phoenix Island”.

Carondelet Reef
Reynold's report of 1828 included an unnamed reef at coordinates similar to those of Carondelet Reef.

Baker Island
In August 1825, Captain Obed Starbuck of the whaler Loper sighted a low, barren island at 0°11'N, 176°20'W, which he named "New Nantucket" after his home (Nantucket, Massachusetts). Starbuck had previously discovered islands in the Ellice group. The island was later named after Capt. Michael Baker, who had discovered guano deposits on the island in 1839. Today, Baker Island is a United States territory; it is one of the U.S. Minor Outlying Islands.

Howland Island
Howland Island is United States territory, and one of the U.S. Minor Outlying Islands. The discovery of Howland Island is sometimes credited to Captain George B Worth of the Nantucket whaler , around 1822, who called it "Worth Island". Daniel MacKenzie of the American whaler Minerva Smith, charted the island in 1828, and, believing it to be a new discovery, named it after his ship's owners.

Later history
Most of the Phoenix Islands were annexed by Great Britain in the late 19th century. The United States claimed Howland and Baker Islands in 1935. In 1937, Britain incorporated all the islands in the Phoenix group, except for Howland and Baker islands, into the Gilbert and Ellice Islands colony. The United States claimed sovereignty over Canton and Enderbury in 1938, but in 1939 entered into an agreement with Britain to form the Canton and Enderbury Islands condominium and exercise joint control over the two islands for a term of 50 years. (The agreement continued in force until 1979, when it was nullified by Kiribati independence.)  During this period of joint U.S.-British control, Canton was extensively developed, first as a seaplane-landing site, then later as a refueling station for trans-Pacific civilian and military aircraft. It remained in use until 1958.

Although shelled and bombed a few times during World War II, neither Kanton nor any of the Phoenix Islands was ever occupied by Japanese forces.

Between 1938 and 1940, in an effort to reduce overcrowding on the Gilbert Islands, the previously uninhabited Orona (Hull), Manra (Sydney), and Nikumaroro (Gardner) islands were colonised, as part of the Phoenix Islands Settlement Scheme. By 1963, however, the settlements on these three islands were deemed to be unworkable, and the entire population was moved to the Solomon Islands.

During the 1960s and early 1970s, the United States used Kanton as a missile-tracking station. The island was before abandoned altogether in 1976, but then later resettled by members of the I-Kiribati community, who continue to reside there today. In 2008, the government of Kiribati designated the islands the “Phoenix Islands Protected Area”, which was at the time the world's largest marine protected area. Collaborations between Kiribati, the New England Aquarium, and Conservation International have allowed scientific expeditions to explore the Phoenix Islands in order to quantify the ocean's flora and fauna. This area is of particular scientific interest because it has been relatively untouched by human activity.

The Phoenix Islands have been surveyed by TIGHAR in an attempt to determine whether they may have been the landing site of Amelia Earhart, the pilot who disappeared in 1937 over the central Pacific Ocean near Howland Island while she was attempting a circumnavigational flight of the globe.

In May 2010, it was reported that a British sailor, Alex Bond, from Penryn, Cornwall, had saved a group of "desperate and starving" Kanton islanders after chancing upon them on his way to Australia. He happened to pull into a lagoon near Canton Island (which is the only habitable island in the Phoenix Islands chain, and lies to the northeast of Australia), whereupon he discovered that its 24 residents were destitute. A supply ship that had been expected to bring them food four months earlier had never arrived, and the 10 children and 14 adults had been surviving on fish and coconuts.  At the time, Bond was reportedly working for a UK-based disaster-relief charity, ShelterBox, which provides emergency aid to people in need. He contacted the coast guard in Falmouth, England, using his satellite phone, and they in turn arranged for the U.S. Coast Guard to send supplies to the islanders from Honolulu, Hawaii.

See also
 Kiribati
 Phoenix Islands Settlement Scheme
 Under a Jarvis Moon, a 2010 documentary film

References

Further reading

 
Archipelagoes of the Pacific Ocean
Geography of Polynesia
History of Kiribati
Pacific islands claimed under the Guano Islands Act